The Guy Toph Award is believed to be the oldest continuous high school sports award in the USA, and is often described as Hillsborough County, Florida's equivalent to college football's Heisman Trophy. The Guy Toph Award has been presented to senior football players who excel on the field and in the classroom. It was first awarded to Guy Tompkins of Hillsborough High School (Florida) in 1939.

Guy Toph Award Winners

2016: Malik Davis, Jesuit
2015: Markese Hargrove, Plant City
2014: Ray Ray McCloud III, Sickles
2013: Deiondre Porter, Jefferson
2012: Vernon Hargreaves, Wharton
2011: Nelson Agholor, Berkeley Prep
2010: Quentin Williams, Jefferson
2009: C.J. Bennett, Alonso
2008: Dontae Aycock, Chamberlain
2007: Derek Winter, Plant
2006: Robert Marve, Plant
2005: Marcello Trigg, Robinson
2004: Kalvin Bailey, Armwood
2003: John Forbes, Alonso
2002: Andre Caldwell, Jefferson
2001: Eddie Lee Ivery Jr., Chamberlain
2000: Lydell Ross, Gaither
1999: Fred Reid, King
1998: Gary Godsey, Jesuit
1997: Mike Pearson, Armwood
1996: Kenny Kelly, Tampa Catholic
1995: Derrick Edmonds, Hillsborough
1994: Keith Newman, Jefferson
1993: Cliff Dell, King
1992: Brett Zinober, Berkeley Prep
1991: Brian Adcock, Chamberlain
1990: Gary Moore, East Bay
1989: Kirby Dar Dar, Jefferson
1988: Shane Law, Chamberlain
1987: Terry Jordan, Gaither
1986: Trevor Weeks, Armwood
1985: Kirk Kirkpatrick, Brandon
1984: Richard Renninger, Robinson
1983: Joey Nicoletto, Chamberlain
1982: Terry Mallory, Chamberlain
1981: Al López III, Jesuit
1980: Pat O'Brien, Hillsborough
1979: Doug Shields, Plant
1978: Donald White, Chamberlain
1977: Edmund Clau-von Nelson, King
1976: Alan Gray, Plant
1975: Skipper Peek, Jesuit
1974: Mike Bolden, Leto
1973: Dennis Lopez, Jefferson
1972: Mike Long, Robinson
1971: Alfred Pyles, Leto
1970: Steve Walker, Robinson
1969: Gene Killian, Brandon
1968: Danny Beltram, Hillsborough
1967: John Reaves, Robinson
1966: Ralph Tate, King
1965: Mark Ely, Plant
1964: Larry Smith, Robinson
1963: Randy Smith, Robinson
1962: Vernon Korhn, Plant
1961: John Whatley, Chamberlain
1960: Mac Farrington, Hillsborough
1959: John Dent, Chamberlain
1958: Mark Whitehead, Plant
1957: Bob Mackenzie, Plant
1956: Bill Encinosa, Plant
1955: Wayne Williamson, Jefferson
1954: Jimmy Dunn, Hillsborough
1953: Charlie Gil, Plant
1952: Billy Shields, Plant
1951: Dickie Miller, Plant
1950: George Carnes, Plant
1949: Rick Casares, Jefferson
1948: Pete Millian, Plant
1947: Bob Payne, Jefferson
1946: Cecil Perrette, Hillsborough
1945: Hal Griffin, Hillsborough
1944: Ray Jackson, Hillsborough
1943: Bob Belle, Plant
1942: Casper Vaccaro, Hillsborough
1941: Ned Baldwin, Plant
1940: John Smit, Plant
1939: Guy Tompkins, Hillsborough

References

Awards established in 1939
1939 establishments in Florida